Kannan Shankar (17 March 1926 - 5 March 2006) was an Indian film editor, screenwriter and director. He directed more than 80 films in South Indian languages including Tamil, Malayalam, Telugu and Kannada as well as in Hindi.

Film career
Shankar started his film career as an editor Assistant at Central Studios, Coimbatore in 1939 and later moved to Pakshiraja Studios. He later became a successful editor at AVM Studios, before moving into film direction. He gave blockbuster film Alaya mani (1962) for Sivaji Ganesan highest grosser of that year.He went on to direct 7 Sivaji Ganesan films .He gave superhits  like Rajkumar(1964) and Sachaai(1969) with Shammi kapoor and Sadhana in lead roles. Next to P. Neelakantan, Shankar was also credited with creating M. G. Ramachandran's (MGR) movie persona, in 8 movies he had directed MGR. MGR chose Shankar to direct his own production, "Adimai Penn".

Partial filmography

Death
Shankar died due to heart attack at his residence on 5 March 2006 at the age of 79.

References

External links
 

1926 births
2006 deaths
Tamil film editors
Malayalam screenwriters
20th-century Indian film directors
Tamil film directors
Kannada film directors
Telugu film directors
Malayalam film directors
Screenwriters from Kerala
Telugu film editors
Malayalam film editors
Film directors from Kerala
Film editors from Kerala
20th-century Indian screenwriters